Yanghe may refer to:

Areas
Yanghe Mountains (陽和山), former name of Yangming Mountains, mountain range in Hunan
Yanghe Subdistrict (阳和街道), in Yufeng District, Liuzhou, Guangxi
Yanghe (阳和), former territory, today part of Northwest Yanggao County in Shanxi（今山西阳高西北）

Towns

Yanghe, Guangdong (杨和), in Gaoming District, Foshan, Guangdong
Yanghe, Henan (洋河), a town in Xinyang, Henan
Yanghe, Hubei (杨河), in Yingcheng, Hubei

Yanghe, Liaoning (洋河), in Xiuyan Manchu Autonomous County, Liaoning

Yanghe, Shandong (洋河), a village in Jiaozhou, Shandong

Townships
Yanghe Township, Gansu (杨河乡), in Zhuanglang County, Gansu
Yanghe Tujia Ethnic Township (阳和土家族乡), in Cili County, Hunan
Yanghe Township, Ningxia (杨河乡), in Longde County, Ningxia
Yanghe Township, Sichuan (杨河乡), in Ebian Yi Autonomous County, Sichuan

Other uses
Yanghe (洋河), a variety of the Chinese alcoholic beverage Baijiu
Yanghe Stadium, a stadium in Chongqing, China

See also
Yang He (born 1990), Chinese footballer
Yang River (disambiguation)
Yanhe (disambiguation)